Mazijan (also Romanized as Mazījān and Mazeyjān; also known as Mazū) is a village in Asir Rural District, Asir District, Mohr County, Fars Province, Iran. At the 2016 census, its population was 1200, in 200 families.

References 

Populated places in Mohr County